Karma Triyana Dharmachakra is a Tibetan Buddhist monastery in Woodstock, New York, United States, which serves as the North American seat of the 17th Gyalwa Karmapa, head of the Karma Kagyu lineage. It was founded in 1976 by the 16th Gyalwa Karmapa with Khenpo Karthar Rinpoche as abbot.  He held this position until his death in 2019.  The
Third Bardor Tulku Rinpoche stayed in the United States to help Khenpo Karthar Rinpoche and Mr. Tenzin Chonyi establish and develop Karma Triyana Dharmachakra.

References

External links
Homepage of KTD

Buddhist temples in New York (state)
Buddhist monasteries in the United States
Chinese-American culture in New York (state)
Tibetan Buddhism in the United States
Karma Kagyu monasteries and temples
Religious buildings and structures in Ulster County, New York
Woodstock, New York
Religious buildings and structures in New York (state)